Agnippe is a genus of moths in the family Gelechiidae.

Species
Agnippe abdita (Braun, 1925)
Agnippe aequorea (Meyrick, 1917)
Agnippe albidorsella (Snellen, 1884)
Agnippe aulonota (Meyrick, 1917)
Agnippe biscolorella Chambers, 1872
Agnippe conjugella (Caradja, 1920)
Agnippe crinella Keifer, 1927
Agnippe deserta Bidzilya & H.H. Li, 2010
Agnippe dichotoma (Li, 1993)
Agnippe echinulata (Li, 1993)
Agnippe echinuloides Bidzilya & H.H. Li, 2010
Agnippe evippeella Busck, 1906
Agnippe fuscopulvella Chambers, 1872
Agnippe kuznetzovi (Lvovsky & Piskunov, 1989)
Agnippe laudatella (Walsingham, 1907)
Agnippe leuconota (Zeller, 1873)
Agnippe lunaki (Rebel, 1941)
Agnippe miniscula (Li, 1993)
Agnippe novisyrictis (Li, 1993)
Agnippe omphalopa (Meyrick, 1917)
Agnippe prunifoliella (Chambers, 1873)
Agnippe pseudolella (Christoph, 1888)
Agnippe separatella Bidzilya & H.H. Li, 2010
Agnippe syrictis (Meyrick, 1936)
Agnippe turanica Bidzilya & H.H. Li, 2010
Agnippe yongdengensis (Li, 1993)
Agnippe zhouzhiensis (Li, 1993)

References

 , 2010: Review of the genus Agnippe (Lepidoptera: Gelechiidae) in the Palaearctic region. European Journal of Entomology 107 (2): 247–265. Abstract: .

 
Moth genera
Litini